Dennis Ayling BSC (23 June 1917 – 24 October 1998) was a British cinematographer. He is best known for his miniature effects cinematography for the 1979 science fiction film Alien, for which he won an Academy Award for Best Visual Effects.

Ayling had a long career of more than 50 years as a film and television commercial cinematographer, and as a cinematographer and director of documentaries.

He also served in photographic reconnaissance squadrons in the Royal Air Force and Royal Canadian Air Force during World War II, and for part of his service was based in Burma, where he covered many key events, including the Japanese surrender.

Filmography

Cinematographer
 The Cool Mikado (1963)
 Money Sings (short) (1963)
 Jugglers and Acrobats (documentary short) (1964)
 9 Days in Summer (documentary, as Denny Ayling) (1967)
 Cucumber Castle (television movie, uncredited) (1970)
 Mr Tumbleweed (television movie) (1971)

Visual Effects
 Alien (director of photography: miniature effects, as Denys Ayling) (1979)

Director
 Men on Wheels (documentary short) (1961)

References

External links 

Dennis Ayling at the British Society of Cinematographers
Images of Dennis Ayling

1917 births
1998 deaths
People from Finchley
Best Visual Effects Academy Award winners
British cinematographers
Royal Air Force personnel of World War II
Royal Canadian Air Force personnel of World War II